The 173rd Massachusetts General Court, consisting of the Massachusetts Senate and the Massachusetts House of Representatives, met in 1983 and 1984 during the governorship of Michael Dukakis. William Bulger served as president of the Senate and Thomas W. McGee served as speaker of the House.

Senators

Representatives

See also
 98th United States Congress
 List of Massachusetts General Courts

References

Further reading

External links

 
 
 
 
 
 
  (1964-1994)

Political history of Massachusetts
Massachusetts legislative sessions
massachusetts
1983 in Massachusetts
massachusetts
1984 in Massachusetts